Bobigny–Pantin–Raymond Queneau is a station on line 5 of the Paris Métro, located on the border between the communes of Pantin and Bobigny, in Seine-Saint-Denis, Île-de-France. It is named after the communes of Bobigny and Pantin, as well as the nearby rue Raymond Queneau, named after Raymond Queneau (1903-1976), a 20th-century French author and member of the Oulipo group whose most famous works were Zazie dans le métro and Exercices de style, set on a bus. Despite its name,  the station serves mainly Pantin (district of Petit-Pantin) and Romainville (district of the Bas-Pays). It only serves a thin industrial fringe in Bobigny.

History 
The station opened on 25 April 1985 with the extension of the line from Église de Pantin to Bobigny–Pablo Picasso.

In 2024, it will be served by line 3 of the T Zen network, a bus rapid transit system. It was originally slated to open 2018, then postponed to the end of 2022, then again to 2024.

In 2019, the station was used by 2,951,030  passengers, making it the 178th busiest of the Métro network out of 302 stations.

In 2020, the station was used by 1,726,493 passengers amidst the COVID-19 pandemic, making it the 143rd busiest of the Métro network out of 305 stations.

In 2021, the station was used by 2,335,465 passengers, making it the 144th busiest of the Métro network out of 305 stations.

Passenger services

Access
The station has two accesses:

 Access 1: avenue de Paris
 Access 2: avenue Anatole France (with an ascending escalator)

Station layout

Platforms
The station has a single island platform flanked by two tracks, with stairs leading to a mezzanine and an emergency staircase at the end of the platform.

Other connections
The station is also served by lines 145,147, 318, and 330 of the RATP Bus Network, and at night, by the line N45 of the Noctilien network.

Nearby 

 Canal de l'Ourcq
 Est Ensemble
 Technicentre Est Européen

Gallery

References

Roland, Gérard (2003). Stations de métro. D’Abbesses à Wagram. Éditions Bonneton.

Paris Métro stations in Bobigny
Paris Métro stations in Pantin
Railway stations in France opened in 1985

Paris Métro line 5